Travis William Tedford (born August 19, 1988) is an American former actor. A child actor during the 1990s, he is best known for portraying Our Gang kid Spanky McFarland in the 1994 feature film The Little Rascals and for being the first Welch's "advertising-spokeskid" beginning in 1994 at age 6.

Biography

Tedford was born in Rockwall, Texas, to Timmy Bill Tedford and Paula Kay Dixon. Tedford graduated from Athens High School (Texas) in 2006 and from Trinity Valley Community College in 2008 with an Associates degree in Liberal Arts.

Filmography

Awards
1995: Young Artist Award for The Little Rascals

References

External links

1988 births
Male actors from Texas
American male child actors
American male film actors
Living people
People from Rockwall, Texas
20th-century American male actors
21st-century American male actors